George Olteanu (born May 3, 1974 in Ștefănești, Argeș) is a former boxer from Romania, who competed for his native country at the 1996 Summer Olympics in Atlanta, United States. 
There he was defeated in the quarter finals of the men's bantamweight division (– 54 kg) by István Kovács of Hungary: 2-24. In 1999 Olteanu won the world title in Houston, Texas. He also competed at the 2000 Summer Olympics.

References
 Profile on Romanian Olympic Committee
 

1974 births
Living people
Boxers at the 1996 Summer Olympics
Boxers at the 2000 Summer Olympics
Olympic boxers of Romania
People from Ștefănești, Argeș
Romanian male boxers
AIBA World Boxing Championships medalists
Bantamweight boxers